Cryptark is an action roguelike video game developed and published by Alientrap for Microsoft Windows, OS X, Linux, and PlayStation 4. The game was released on Microsoft Windows and PlayStation 4 on June 20, 2017.
A sequel named Gunhead is currently in development by Alientrap, and set for release in 2022. Unlike its predecessor, Gunhead will be played from a first-person perspective with VR implementation being a post-release possibility.

Gameplay 
Cryptark is a 2D sci-fi shooter that challenges players with boarding and neutralizing procedurally generated alien starships to earn income for their Privateering enterprise. Players beat each mission by destroying an enemy ship's central core, earning money that they can then use to purchase weapons/equipment for their next missions. Once the player runs out of money the campaign is over.

Reception 
Cryptark received generally favorable reviews from critics, with a score on review aggregator Metacritic of 80/100 and 75/100 for the Microsoft Windows and PlayStation 4 versions respectively.

References 
 Notes

 Footnotes

Additional Review Sources

External links 
 

2017 video games
PlayStation 4 games
PlayStation Network games
Windows games
MacOS games
Linux games
Action video games
Platform games
Roguelike video games
Video games developed in Canada
Single-player video games